Michele Gorman is an American-born British author.

Gorman is represented by Hardman & Swainson. Her debut, Single in the City, was published by Penguin Books; Gorman has now published more than a dozen books with Notting Hill Press in the US and Orion/Trapeze and HarperCollins in the UK and the rest of the world. She also writes cosy romantic comedies under the pen-name Lilly Bartlett.

Career
Gorman was raised in Pittsfield, Massachusetts, and her background is financial rather than literary. She went back to school full-time in Chicago for her master's degree in Sociology. In 1998 she moved to London where she worked as a market analyst for more than a decade.

Her first book, Single in the City, was published by Penguin Books in June 2010. In 2014 she signed with Avon (publisher), an imprint of HarperCollins and in 2017 she moved to HarperImpulse for the publication of her Lilly Bartlett pen-named books. In 2020 she signed with Orion/Trapeze for the publication of The Staycation. Today she is a full-time author living in London.

In 2012, Gorman joined forces with fellow chick lit authors Talli Roland and Belinda Jones to found Notting Hill Press.

Books

References

External links
 
  at HarperCollins
 Michele Gorman at Penguin Books
 Michele Gorman at Hardman & Swainson

Living people
Writers from Pittsfield, Massachusetts
Naturalised citizens of the United Kingdom
British romantic fiction writers
Women romantic fiction writers
British chick lit writers
British women novelists
21st-century British novelists
21st-century British women writers
Year of birth missing (living people)